The striped nothobranch (Nothobranchius taeniopygus) is a species of freshwater fish of East Africa, belonging to the family Aplocheilidae.

Males are readily recognised by their bold blackish scale rims, and anal and caudal fins which have a black margin with a lighter band below; such a colour pattern is not found in other Nothobranchius. Females are nondescript and resemble those of congeners. The anal and dorsal fins of the striped nothobranch have no spines, but, respectively, 16-18 and 11-17 soft rays.

Range and ecology
N. taeniopygus is found in central Tanzania and southern Uganda, and perhaps southwestern Kenya. It has been introduced to other places in its native countries, and probably also Zambia. Earlier it was believed to occur in Burundi also, but this is at least doubtful. This killifish's native range are the drainage basins of Lake Kyoga and Victoria, and the Aswa, Bubu and Malagarasi River.

It's natural habitats are rivers, swamps, freshwater lakes and marshes, temporary pools, floodplains and inland deltas. The pH in its habitat has been measured at 8.2 (somewhat alkaline) and the water hardness at 6° dH (rather soft), but this may not be indicative of its preferences and tolerance as very little data exists. A small carnivore, it feeds on aquatic invertebrates, mainly insect larvae and crustaceans. Like its relatives, it is semelparous and spawns in the dry season. The eggs are deposited in the substrate, and the parents then die, as the small waterbodies which they inhabit would mostly dry up anyway. The eggs are adapted to surviving the drying-up in diapause, and can even be entirely outside the water for a time, as long as the substrate is still moist. They hatch after 3–5 months.

It is not considered a threatened species by the IUCN. Locally, populations may disappear after habitat destruction and water pollution by agriculture. On the other hand, it is very widespread and resilient, and to some degree used for mosquito control in and around its native range. It is sometimes found as an aquarium fish, but unlike some other Nothobranchius, it is difficult to keep as its requirements are still insufficiently known.

Taxonomy
The notobranchs were formerly included in the family Aplocheilidae, but they are not as closely related to Aplocheilus as was long believed.

The IUCN Red List gives Astatotilapia stappersii as a junior synonym of N. taeniopygus, but this is a lapsus; A. stappersii is a cichlid, not notobranch, and the IUCN indeed has a separate entry for it (under the name Haplochromis stappersii).

Footnotes

Striped nothobranch
Taxonomy articles created by Polbot
Taxa named by Franz Martin Hilgendorf
Fish described in 1891